Natalya Petrovna Boyko (born in 1946) is a Soviet sprint canoer who competed in the early 1970s. She won two gold medals in the K-4 500 m event at the ICF Canoe Sprint World Championships, earning them in 1970 and 1971.

References

1946 births
Living people
Soviet female canoeists
Russian female canoeists
ICF Canoe Sprint World Championships medalists in kayak